Idris Ichala Wada  (born 26 August 1950) is a Nigerian retired pilot and politician. On 9 December 2011, he was elected as the 3rd governor of Kogi State under the platform of People's Democratic Party. Idris was however succeeded by Yahaya Bello on 27 January 2016 after losing his re-election bid in the 2015 Kogi State gubernatorial election.

References

1950 births
Living people
Nigerian Muslims
Peoples Democratic Party (Nigeria) politicians
Governors of Kogi State